The Oates House (also known as the Shoemaker House) is a historic home in Abbeville, Alabama.  The house was originally built in 1900 by local farmer Ephraim Oates, cousin of Alabama Governor William C. Oates.  In 1910, he greatly expanded the house, adding a second story and remodeling it in a Neoclassical style.  The house was purchased in 1927 by the Shoemaker family, who added floor-to-ceiling casement windows to the front rooms.

The main façade is dominated by four Tuscan columns supporting a triangular pediment, creating a full-height entry portico.  The main entrance has a transom and sidelights, and is flanked by floor-to-ceiling casement windows with a balcony above.  End windows on the first floor and the four second floor windows are two-over-two double hung sash windows.  The north side of the house features a porte-cochère supported by two Tuscan columns, with a balcony above.  A shed-roofed sleeping porch adorns the south side, and on the rear is a one-story kitchen addition and screened porch.  The interior features a central hall with rooms on either side on both floors.

References

National Register of Historic Places in Henry County, Alabama
Houses on the National Register of Historic Places in Alabama
Neoclassical architecture in Alabama
Houses completed in 1900
Houses in Henry County, Alabama